The REWE Group is a German diversified retail and tourism co-operative group based in Cologne, Germany. The name REWE comes from Revisionsverband der Westkauf-Genossenschaften", meaning "Western Buying Co-operatives Auditing Association". The most important companies under the umbrella of the REWE Group operate under the REWE-Zentral AG and REWE-Zentralfinanz eG names. The basis of the co-operative trade group consists of a network of independent retailers. In the 2017 financial year, the REWE Group had total external sales of €57.8 billion. The REWE Group is the second largest supermarket chain in Germany behind EDEKA.

Divisions

Trading 
 REWE – supermarket chain in Germany with 3,300 stores.
 BILLA – supermarket chain with over 1,000 stores in Austria and 400 stores in other European countries
 Penny –  discount supermarket chain with 3,000 stores in Germany, Austria, Italy, Romania, Hungary, Czech Republic 
 nahkauf – convenience store operator in Germany.
 toom BauMarkt – A DIY/home improvement chain with 250 stores in Germany
 Billa Plus – supermarket chain with 100 stores in Austria (formerly known as Merkur)
 BIPA – health and beauty retail chain with 560 stores in Austria and 58 stores in Croatia
 REWE Ihr Kaufpark – supermarket chain with 120 stores in North Rhine-Westphalia, Germany (formerly known as Kaufpark)
 Palink – supermarket chain in Lithuania

Tourism 
DER Touristik is the tourism division of Rewe Group: 
 Tour operator brands: ITS, Jahn Reisen, Tjaereborg, Dertour, Meier’s Weltreisen and ADAC Reisen and clevertours.com
 Hotel brands: lti Hotels, Club Calimera and PrimaSol Hotels

In June 2015 DER acquired Kuoni Travel's European tour operations.

Country ranking in 2006 

 *Sales of retail activities

Digital Business 
In 2013, the REWE Group founded a subsidiary named REWE Digital, which is responsible for all strategic online activities. The group also acquired the e-commerce platform vendor commercetools and ZooRoyal, an e-commerce website for animal food and pet supplies.
In 2017 REWE Group announced to make additional investments in the billions in order to further digitalize their business.
In 2020 REWE digital, for the first time, spun-off one of its business units and founded the independent company OC Fulfillment GmbH, vendor of the omnichannel fulfillment software-as-a-service platform fulfillmenttools.
In 2021 REWE Group announced the inception of Paymenttools, provider of on- and offline payment solutions for retailers.

Cassis de Dijon 
In 1979, Rewe won a significant case in the European Court of Justice, the Cassis de Dijon case.

References

External links 

 REWE Group

Cooperatives in Germany
Companies based in Cologne
Retail companies of Germany
Retail companies established in 1927
German companies established in 1927
German brands
Retailers' cooperatives